The Anne Frank Foundation is a foundation in the Netherlands originally established to maintain the Anne Frank House in Amsterdam. This foundation also advocates the fight against antisemitism and racism and publishes the Dutch annual Monitor Racisme en Extreem-rechts (Racism and Extreme Right Monitor), in which the activities of present-day racists and extreme rightists are studied.

Outside the Netherlands, the Anne Frank Foundation organizes expositions and information on Anne Frank.

The Anne Frank Stichting was founded on 3 May 1957 to prevent the tearing down of the house in Amsterdam in which Anne Frank was hidden since 1942 during the German occupation of the Netherlands in the Second World War. In 1960 the Anne Frank Huis became a museum.

The director of the foundation was Hans Westra, who retired in 2011 and was followed by Ronald Leopold.

References

External links
 Official website
  Anne Frank Quotes

Anne Frank
Anti-racism in the Netherlands
Jewish Dutch history
Opposition to antisemitism in Europe
Foundations based in the Netherlands
Non-profit organisations based in the Netherlands